Avtonomovka is a rural locality (a selo) in Sosnovsky Selsoviet of Seryshevsky District, Amur Oblast, Russia. The population was 129 as of 2018. There are 3 streets.

Geography 
Avtonomovka is located 53 km east of Seryshevo (the district's administrative centre) by road. Verkhneborovaya is the nearest rural locality.

References 

Rural localities in Seryshevsky District